Fernando Rodriguez (born June 18, 1984) is an American former professional baseball pitcher. He played in Major League Baseball (MLB) for the Los Angeles Angels of Anaheim, Houston Astros, and Oakland Athletics. He made his MLB debut in May 2009.

Career

Los Angeles Angels
Rodriguez was selected by the Los Angeles Angels in the 11th round of the 2003 Major League Baseball draft, and signed with the club on June 25, 2003. He played in the Angels' farm system from 2003 through 2010. He made his major league debut against the New York Yankees on May 2, 2009, at Yankee Stadium, pitching  of an inning in relief, giving up three runs (two earned) on a hit and two walks; it was his only MLB appearance with the Angels. Rodriguez became a free agent on November 6, 2010.

Houston Astros
Rodriguez signed with the Houston Astros on November 10, 2010. He was assigned to the Triple-A Oklahoma City RedHawks. On May 17, 2011, Rodriguez was called up by the Astros. He made his first appearance with the team on May 28, and would go on to appear in 47 games during the season, recording a 3.96 ERA and 2–3 record. In 2012, Rodriguez made 71 appearances with Houston, registering a 2–10 record with 5.37 ERA.

Oakland Athletics
In February 2013, the Astros traded Rodriguez and Jed Lowrie to the Oakland Athletics for Chris Carter, Brad Peacock, and Max Stassi. Rodriguez had season-ending Tommy John surgery on March 28, and missed the entire 2013 season.

Rodriguez signed a one-year contract with the Athletics for 2014, avoiding arbitration. However, he was designated for assignment by the A's on December 18, 2013, only a couple weeks after signing the deal, removing him from the 40-man roster to allow for pitcher Eury De La Rosa to be added from the Arizona Diamondbacks. Rodriguez was ultimately assigned to the Triple-A Sacramento River Cats, re-added to the 40-man roster, and made seven MLB appearances for Oakland during the 2014 season, recording an ERA of 1.00 in seven appearances.

In 2015, Rodriguez made 56 appearances with the A's, pitching to a 4–2 record with 3.84 ERA in 56 relief appearances. In 2016, he made 34 relief appearances, with a 4.20 ERA and 2–0 record. Rodriguez was sent outright to Triple-A after the 2016 season, and elected to become a free agent.

Chicago Cubs
In December 2016, Rodriguez signed a minor league contract with the Chicago Cubs. He was assigned to the Triple-A Iowa Cubs for 2017. He was released on July 17, after making nine appearances with a 3.09 ERA.

Boston Red Sox
Rodriguez signed a minor league deal with the Boston Red Sox in August 2017. He made two appearances with the GCL Red Sox late in the season. For the 2018 season, Rodriguez was assigned to the Triple-A Pawtucket Red Sox. He elected free agency on November 3, 2018.

San Diego Padres
On January 24, 2019, Rodriguez signed a minor league deal with the San Diego Padres. He was released on June 2, 2019.

References

External links

, or Retrosheet

1984 births
Living people
Major League Baseball pitchers
Baseball players from Texas
Los Angeles Angels players
Houston Astros players
Oakland Athletics players
Arizona League Angels players
Cedar Rapids Kernels players
Rancho Cucamonga Quakes players
Arkansas Travelers players
Salt Lake Bees players
Oklahoma City RedHawks players
Sacramento River Cats players
El Paso Tejanos baseball players
Provo Angels players
Tiburones de La Guaira players
American expatriate baseball players in Venezuela
Nashville Sounds players
Iowa Cubs players
Gulf Coast Red Sox players
Pawtucket Red Sox players
El Paso Chihuahuas players
Duluth Huskies players